Cranbourne is a co-educational secondary school in Basingstoke, northern Hampshire, England. The school serves Key Stage 3 and Key Stage 4 students between the ages of 11 and 16. The school follows the National Curriculum.

History
Cranbourne was founded as the Cranbourne Bi-Lateral School in 1967 as a bilateral school for 11- to 18-year-olds, on the site of a former nursery. It became a comprehensive school in 1972 following the establishment of Queen Mary's Sixth Form College, and then as Cranbourne Business and Enterprise College in September 2004. Cranbourne (or CBEC) became the first of two Business and Enterprise Colleges in Hampshire in 2004 and features scola architecture refurbished in 2006. CBEC is separated into 9 blocks and features a small swimming pool and a 3-story Science block (C block). The School changed its name back to Cranbourne (from CBEC) in September 2018 introducing a new Logo and Uniform.

Head Teachers

Mr Willis - 1967-1971

Mr Duke - 1971-1981

Mr Terry Ayres - 1981-1997

Mrs Ann Morrison - 1997-2006

Mrs Betty Elikins - 2006-2016

Mr Malcolm Christian - (Interm) 2016-2018

Mrs Jane Alpin - 2018–Present.

Amalgamating with Fort Hill Community School
At the end of the 2015-2016 academic year, Headmistress Betty Elkins resigned and Jane Aplin took over as Head. There are plans to merge the students of Fort Hill Community School with CBEC's due to low numbers at Fort Hill. At the county councils decision in June 2017, it was recommended and approved that Fort Hill will close on 31 August 2017. All Fort Hill pupils will start at Cranbourne in September 2017. Parents who received a place at Fort Hill for their child have been automatically given a place at Cranbourne.

Alumni
Shelley Conn
Alex Thomson
Ramon Tikaram
Tanita Tikaram

References

External links
 

Schools in Basingstoke
Secondary schools in Hampshire
Educational institutions established in 1967
1967 establishments in England
Community schools in Hampshire